Jose Javier Pérez Ramirez (born April 11, 1967), better known by his stage name Javier Monthiel, is a Honduran singer and composer and one of the most outstanding artists in the country. Among his original works are Así es mi tierra, Mujeres Latinas, Amiga and Más allá del Corazón, songs that among others have allowed him to reach international stages and to be currently one of the most important figures of Honduran music.

Biography 
Javier Monthiel was born on April 11, 1967 in Ocotepeque, son of Antonio Leiva and Tereza de Jesús Ramirez. Javier inherited his musical aptitude from his father, who was a Honduran saxophonist and musician by profession. However, Javier did not meet his father until he was twelve years old and never spent much time with him. More influential in his life was his stepfather Valentín Pérez, a railway worker, whom Javier credits with having taught him honesty, humility and the value of hard work. Javier began to sing at the school, initially at Soledad Fernández Cruz and then at the Dionisio de Herrera institute in San Pedro Sula, where in 1984 he won the Summer Song Festival championship in Tela, Atlántida in 1984.

After Javier finished school in 1985, he worked at the national telecommunications company, Hondutel. During this time he performed at the amateur level and matured as a composer. In 1990, Javier Monthiel also entered the Universidad Nacional Autónoma de Honduras, where he obtained a degree in Business administration in 1998. In 1990 he also launched his professional career with the release of his first album produced in the Republic of El Salvador. This album included two original works, Tus Ojos Son and Culpables Rápido. These songs quickly became known within the romantic genre in Honduras.

Recognized in Honduras by 1992, Javier Monthiel signed an artistic contract with a soft drink bottling company to perform in a series of concerts together with other artists from Latin America. During this tour, Javier shared the stage acting alternately with the puertorriqueño Chayanne in soccer stadiums in Honduras and Guatemala. After these successful performances, Javier Monthiel opened the concerts of the Mexican Yuri, the Argentinian Enanitos Verdes and Soda Stereo and the Venezuelan Ricardo Montaner among others. He subsequently alternated concerts with other international artists and opened presentations at important artistic and cultural events in Honduras, such as beauty pageants and the OTI Festival.

In 1995 Javier Monthiel began presentations that would propel him to become one of the best-known artists in the country. That year he was invited to sing the Honduran National Anthem at the opening of the World Cup competitions in San Pedro Sula. This was followed by presentations at the Estadio Azteca in Mexico City, the Miami Orange Bowl at Miami, the Robert F. Kennedy Memorial Stadium at Washington DC, Estadio Revolución (now Estadio Rommel Fernández) in the city of Panama and Estadio Cuscatlán in El Salvador among others. Then, a year later, he was called to sing the National Anthem of Honduras for games of the Honduras national team when it played in the 1998 FIFA World Cup in France.

Today Javier Monthiel has 15 album productions, a wide variety of video musical clips produced in national and international stages, and a whole range of promotional material of international quality. These are representative of the discography and videography of this Central American artist, and documentaries in which he has participated.

Recognitions and awards

Original compositions 
Javier Monthiel's compositions include romantic and merengue songs, and the fusion of both genres.

Bachata 
 Aquella noche

Ballad

Pop ballad 
 Tus ojos son

Rock ballad 
 Niños en la calle

Merengue 
 Mujeres Latinas esa chica quiere
 Si tu no estas ( versión merengue)

Ranchera 
 Tu Falso Amor

Romantic 
 Amiga
 Ay mujer
 Cuando entregas amor
 Culpables
 Dime tu
 En el día del amor
 Ganas de ti
 Jamás, jamás
 Mas allá del corazón
 Mi fan número uno
 Mi niña
 Paz en la ciudad
 Si tu no estas
 Tú en Navidad
 Una canción cantaré

Fusion rhythms 
 Así es mi tierra
 Es Honduras
 Al ritmo del gol

Discography 
The albums by Javier Monthiel recall the flavor of the land of Honduras and the cultural wealth of its people. Javier Monthiel's entire discography is original work by the artist. His compositions range in genres from romantic ballad, through merengue, cumbia, rock ballad, and bachata.

 1990 Tus ojos Son
 1992 Suena guitarra suena
 1993 Solo sin tí
 1997 Es Honduras
 2001 Amiga
 2002 Más allá del corazón
 2003 Si tú no estás
 2005 Mujeres Latinas
 2006 Esa chica quiere
 2008 Hay mujer
 2010 Madrecita del Alma
 2011 Mi viejo mi Amiga
 2014 Paz en la ciudad
 2015 Una canción Cantaré
 2016 Clásicos Hondureños y Más
 2017 Aquella noche

Videos 
 Amiga
 Bananero
 Cantare para Tí
 En El Día del Amor
 Es Honduras
 Esa Chica Quiere
 Ganas de Tí
 Himno Nacional de Honduras
 Honduras Mi Tierra — This work gives recognition to the ethnic groups of Honduras and thereby highlights their cultural values.
 Jamás
 Madrecita del Alma
 Mas Alla del Corazón
 Mi Viejo Mi Amigo
 Mujer
 Mujeres Latinas
 Noche de Luna en La Ceiba
 Si Tu no Estas
 Tú en Navidad
 Una Canción Cantare
 Virgen de Suyapa

Artists with whom Javier Monthiel has performed

See also 
 Music of Honduras
 Culture of Honduras
 Guillermo Anderson
 Moisés Canelo

References

External links 

 Sitio web oficial
 
 
 

1967 births
Living people
Latin pop singers
Latin music songwriters
Honduran male singers
Honduran composers
Spanish-language singers
Male composers
20th-century composers
21st-century composers
People from Ocotepeque Department
Universidad Nacional Autónoma de Honduras alumni
20th-century male singers
21st-century male singers